An egg waffle is a spherical egg-based waffle popular in Hong Kong and Macau, consisting of an eggy leavened batter cooked between two plates of semi-spherical cells. They are usually served hot, and often eaten plain, although they may be served with fruit and flavors such as strawberry, coconut or chocolate. It is referred to by its original Cantonese name, gai daan jai (雞蛋仔), and in English, an egg puff, bubble waffle, eggette, pancake balls, pancake waffle, egglet, and puffle. They are sometimes referred to as Hong Kong cakes in Chinatowns across America, especially in New York.  One piece of egg waffle can have around 20 to 35 small round 'balls'.

Egg waffles are among the most popular Hong Kong "street snacks" and were ranked No. 1 in a 100 most popular HK street snack listing. They have been a favored street snack since their emergence in the 1950s, when they were made with coal fire heating and sold from street kiosks in Hong Kong.

History
The origins of the egg waffle or gai daan jai (which literally translates to "little chicken egg") are unknown, despite being ingrained in the memories of Hong Kong residents young and old. One story says the enterprising post-war generation created the egg-shaped mold to make up for an eggless batter, as eggs used to be a luxury. Another tale points to street hawkers who bought damaged eggs on the cheap to work them into a batter, resulting in the classic golden color of the cake. It also is reasonable to suggest that the special iron skillet used to mold the gai daan tsai is a Hong Kong take on the traditional checkered European waffle press. Today, the two related snacks are often sold by the same stall. There is also another tale that it originated from the 1950s, when a sundry shop owner did not want to waste broken eggs and tried to add flour, butter etc. and baked it in a mold. However, in 1944, Mr Cheung, the founder of a food stall, began using a cart to sell daan jai kau which is the predecessor of egg waffle. Daan Jai Kau is bigger than an egg waffle, and it is often divided into 30 pieces for selling by the hawkers.

Preparation

Egg waffles are made from a sweet, egg-rich batter that is cooked on a hot griddle, a special frying pan with small round cells (resembling an æbleskiver pan but with a higher number of smaller round cells). The griddle is set on hot coals in the fire, or more commonly on an electrical heater. The batter is poured over the special frying pan and heated; the small ovals of egg waffles are thus formed. The crucial key to prepare a crispy egg waffle is to turn over the pan quickly after the batter is poured into the hot frying pan. This could create an egg waffle that is crispy on top, and cake-like on the bottom. The waffle is also crispy on the outside with each bubble providing a fluffiness on the inside. In addition to the conventional "egg taste", they are also available in a variety of flavours such as chocolate, green-tea, ginger, etc. Most batters used in egg waffle are quick breads, although some are also made using a yeast-raised or fermented batter. Egg waffles can be eaten at different times of the day, depending on local tradition.

Modern flavours
Despite the origin of the traditional egg waffle is from Hong Kong, it is nowadays being reinvented all around the world. It is common to see the egg waffle in a variety of flavours such as green tea, chocolate, cheese or purple sweet potato, but it has also gained popularity as a dessert in which it is served with different kinds of ice cream.

See also

 Pandan waffle, a Vietnamese snack
 Æbleskiver, a similar Danish dish
 Kuzhi paniyaram, a similar dish from the south of India
 Paper wrapped cake, a Hong Kong egg sponge cake
 Poffertjes, a similar Dutch dish
Taiyaki
 Takoyaki, a similar Japanese dish with savory octopus filling
 Imagawayaki
 List of quick breads

References

Further reading

External links

 Gai daan tsai challenge: The quest for Hong Kong's best egg waffle

Pancakes
Waffles
Quick breads
Sweet breads
Hong Kong cuisine
Hong Kong desserts
Street food